Trent Joseph Cameron  (born May 16, 1979, in Los Angeles County, California) is an American actor best known for his roles as John Lee Malvo in D.C. Sniper: 23 Days of Fear, as Jerel Goodrich in the UPN sitcom The Parkers and as Young Roland in The Wood.

Filmography

References

External links

Living people
1979 births